Tikitotmoniki Totems (alternate spelling: Tikitotemoniki Totems; sometimes abbreviated as Tikitotmoniki or Tiki Totems) is a series of four outdoor 2001 sculptures by American artist Kenny Scharf, located at Jamison Square in Portland, Oregon.

Description

The four abstract painted aluminum totem poles each measure ,  x  x  and cover Portland Streetcar catenary poles (poles supporting trolley wires). According to Scharf, "These four Tiki Totem monikers are a fantasy come true. To realize something of this magnitude is beyond my wildest dreams. I love the way they relate to the Pacific Northwest culture as well as the universal Tiki culture, which extends from the South Pacific through the Northwest and up to Alaska. As I've said before, art should, above all, be fun, and these huge 3D forms translate that perfectly."

The totems were funded by the Pearl Arts Foundation. The works are part of the collection of the Regional Arts & Culture Council.

See also

 2001 in art

References

External links
 
 The Deal of the Art: Public Art Comes of Age by John Motley, Metroscape (pg. 29)
 Biking, Walking, Transit and More (PDF), City of Portland, Oregon

2001 establishments in Oregon
2001 sculptures
Abstract sculptures in Oregon
Aluminum sculptures in Oregon
Outdoor sculptures in Portland, Oregon
Pearl District, Portland, Oregon
Totem poles in the United States